Lansdowne Airport  is a small, local airport on the East Side of Youngstown, Ohio, US near the Pennsylvania state line.  Lansdowne Airport is a privately owned airport, located in an area known as the "Sharon Line" to locals, due to its proximity to a defunct train line that once ran from Youngstown to Sharon, right across the state line through the Steel Valleys.

The airport was dedicated as Lansdowne Field in late October 1926. It was named for Lieutenant Commander Zachary Lansdowne, an Ohio native and commander of the US Navy airship USS Shenandoah (ZR-1), which crashed in Ava, Ohio, in 1925. Rear Admiral William A. Moffett, then the head of the Navy's Bureau of Aeronautics and champion of airships, was in attendance.

Lansdowne Airport was the first airport in Youngstown and was the first in the region to see airmail service. Because of the increasing size in airplanes and the lack of a suitable amount of land in the vicinity of Lansdowne, a decision was made to build Youngstown Municipal Airport eleven miles away in Vienna, Ohio.

See also
Salem Airpark
Youngstown Elser Metro Airport
Youngstown Executive Airport
Youngstown-Warren Regional Airport

References

External links

Airports in Ohio
Transportation in Youngstown, Ohio
Buildings and structures in Youngstown, Ohio
Transportation in Mahoning County, Ohio